was a stored-fare system using magnetic cards of the 22 members of the Passnet Association in the Kantō region of Japan. It was available between October 14, 2000 and January 11, 2008 in 1,000, 3,000 and 5,000 yen varieties. There were also 500-yen tailor-made designs for ceremonies such as weddings and funerals, most of which are presumably still remained to be known.

The name “Passnet” was originality a name for the stored-fare system and many of each Passnet Card issuers had a name for their cards, for instance, SF Metro Card from TRTA and its successor Tokyo Metro or SF Tobu Card from Tobu. Later, the cards themselves came to be called “Passnet”.

The Passnet Card used almost the same system as IO Card by JR East in view of uniting the card system. 

The Passnet system was superseded by the Pasmo contactless smart card system introduced on March 18, 2007. Sales of Passnet cards ceased from January 11, 2008 and were no longer used in ticket gates from March 15, 2008. Passnet cards are still used to purchase tickets from ticket machines after this date.

References

Fare collection systems in Japan